Geling Gewog (Dzongkha: དགེ་གླིང་) is a gewog (village block) of Chukha District, Bhutan. The gewog has an area of 247 square kilometres and contains 11 villages.

References 

Gewogs of Bhutan
Chukha District